In the Zone is a 2003 album by Britney Spears.

In the Zone may also refer to:

Music
 Britney Spears: In the Zone, a 2004 video album
 In the Zone (Wayman Tisdale album) or the title song, 1996 
 "In the Zone" (song), by Ivy Queen, 1999
 "In the Zone", a song by Blueface from Find the Beat, 2020

Television
 "In the Zone" (NCIS), an episode
 "In the Zone" (The Outer Limits), an episode
 "In the Zone", a special episode of The Magic School Bus Rides Again

Other uses
 In the Zone (play), a 1917 play by Eugene O'Neill
 In the Zone, the third part of Thomas Pynchon's novel Gravity's Rainbow
 In the zone (psychology), or flow, a mental state